Robert Henry English (16 January 1888 – 21 January 1943) was a United States Navy commissioned officer who commanded the U.S. Navy's submarine force in the Pacific Theater of Operations early in World War II.

English was born in Warrenton, Georgia, and he was a member of the United States Naval Academy class of 1911. Early in his naval career he became a submariner. In 1917, while commanding the submarine , he received the Navy Cross for his great heroism in rescuing an officer trapped in the submarine  after an explosion.

After a series of important assignments, he became commanding officer of the light cruiser , and during the Japanese attack on Pearl Harbor in Hawaii on 7 December 1941 was one of the first to bring his ship into action.

In the accident, English and other Navy officers were passengers on a four-engine Martin M-130 flying boat, being flown by a Pan American Airways civilian crew. The aircraftdubbed the Philippine Clipper before the U.S Navy purchased it and pressed it into service  during World War IIwas destroyed in the accident; all 19 aboard were killed.

For his exceptionally meritorious service in his last assignment, English was posthumously awarded the Distinguished Service Medal.

Namesake
, an Allen M. Sumner-class destroyer in commission from 1944 to 1970, was named in English's honor.

References

External links
 history.navy.mil: USS English 

1888 births
1943 deaths
Accidental deaths in California
United States Navy personnel of World War I
United States Navy World War II admirals
Attack on Pearl Harbor
Battle of Midway
People from Warrenton, Georgia
Military personnel from Georgia (U.S. state)
Recipients of the Navy Distinguished Service Medal
Recipients of the Navy Cross (United States)
United States Navy rear admirals (upper half)
United States Naval Academy alumni
United States submarine commanders
Victims of aviation accidents or incidents in 1943
Victims of aviation accidents or incidents in the United States
Burials at Arlington National Cemetery
United States Navy personnel killed in World War II